Luis Mosquera (born 14 December 1964) is an Ecuadorian footballer. He played in eight matches for the Ecuador national football team from 1987 to 1988. He was also part of Ecuador's squad for the 1987 Copa América tournament.

References

1964 births
Living people
Ecuadorian footballers
Ecuador international footballers
Place of birth missing (living people)
Association football defenders
C.D. El Nacional footballers
S.D. Quito footballers
C.D. ESPOLI footballers
S.D. Aucas footballers
Ecuadorian football managers